Jagannath Sarkar (born 2 January 1963) is an Indian politician who has been a Member of Lok Sabha for Ranaghat since 2019.

Personal life
Sarkar was born on 2 January 1963 to Bhim Chandra Sarkar and Nani Bala Sarkar in Tashuli village of Bankura district, West Bengal. He graduated with Bachelor of Arts from Santipur College in 1984 and Bachelor of Education degree from Kalyani University in 1986-1987. He married Arpita Sarkar (Baidya) on 2 November 1999, with whom he has a son and a daughter. Sarkar is a teacher and farmer by profession.

Political career
Sarkar is the general secretary of the Nadia district unit of the Bharatiya Janata Party. On 10 April 2019, the party nominated him for the 2019 Indian general election from the Ranaghat constituency, after the nomination of Mukatmoni Adhikari was rejected. On 23 May, he was elected to the Lok Sabha after defeating his nearest rival, Rupali Biswas of the Trinamool Congress. On 26 June 2021, he filed F.I.R/Complaint against social media user for "defaming his name and false news about him".

References

1963 births
Living people
India MPs 2019–present
Lok Sabha members from West Bengal
Bharatiya Janata Party politicians from West Bengal
People from Bankura district
People from Nadia district
West Bengal MLAs 2021–2026